Emily Sarah Holt (1836–1893) was an English novelist. She was born at Stubbylee, Bacup, in Lancashire, 25 April 1836. She was the eldest daughter of John Holt whose wife Judith was the 3rd daughter of James Mason of Greens (who was JP for  Lancashire and the West Riding). It is said she was educated at Oxford. In late 1893 when at Harrogate, she became ill and went to her brother in Balham (London), where she died on Christmas Day.

She was buried in the Church of St Saviour's, Bacup, where there is a memorial.

Holt had written over fifty books, mainly for children. Most of Holt's work can be classified as historical novels (52 are listed in the BML catalogue). Holt's work has a Protestant religious theme.

Works
Novels unless otherwise stated

Memoirs Of Royal Ladies 2 volumes 1861 
Mistress Margery 1868
Ashcliffe Hall 1870 
Sister Rose 1870
Isoult Barry Of Wynscote, Her Diurnal Book 1871 
Robin Tremayne 1872
The Well In The Desert 1872 
Verena non-fiction 1873 
The White Rose Of Langley 1875
Clare Avery 1876
Imogen 1876
For The Master's Sake 1877
Lettice Eden 1877
Margery's Son 1878
Lady Sybil's Choice 1879
Earl Hubert's Daughter 1880
The Maidens' Lodge 1880
Joyce Morrell's Harvest 1881 
At Ye Grene Griffin 1882
Red And White 1882
Stephen Mainwaring's Wooing, With Other Fireside Tales, (w others) (short stories) 1882 
Not For Him 1883
The Way Of The Cross, (short stories) 1883 
John De Wycliffe, The First Of The Reformers, biography 1884 
Ye Olden Time, non-fiction 1884
The Lord Mayor 1884
Wearyholme 1884 
The Lord Of The Marches 1884 
A Tangled Web 1885
'Feed My Sheep''' non-fiction 1886 In All Time Of Our Tribulation, fiction 1887All For The Best 1887 The Slave Girl Of Pompeii 1887Our Little Lady 1887Out In The Forty-Five 1888 In Convent Walls 1888King And Priest, non-fiction 1888The Pulpit And The Pews, non-fiction 1888 A Talk With The Vicar, non-fiction 1888 The King's Daughters 1888 It Might Have Been 1889 Minster Lovel 1890Behind The Veil 1890The White Lady Of Hazelwood 1891 Countess Maud 1892 One Snowy Night 1893 The Harvest Of Yesterday 1893 Princess Adelaide 1893All's Well 1893  The Priest On His Throne, And The Priests At Their Altars,  essays 1894 Through The Storm 1895The Gold That Glitters 1896Lights In The Darkness biography'' 1896

External links
 
 
 
Evangelical historiography: a Victorian popular example Emily Sarah Holt at The Little Professor on Victorian Literature. Accessed January 2008
 Full list of works at Athlstane on line publishers. Accessed January 2008
Reviving the reformation: Victorian women writers and the protestant historical novel Author: Burstein, Miriam, Women's Writing, Volume 12, Number 1, March 2005, pp. 73–84(12). Publisher: Routledge

1836 births
1893 deaths
19th-century English novelists
19th-century English women writers
English women novelists
People from Bacup
English historical novelists
Women historical novelists